The Estadio Salto del Caballo is a multi-use stadium located in Toledo, Castile-La Mancha, Spain. 
It is currently used for football matches and is the home stadium of CD Toledo.

References

External links
CD Toledo profile on Futbolme 
Estadios de España 

Football venues in Castilla–La Mancha
CD Toledo
Sports venues completed in 1973
Buildings and structures in Toledo, Spain
Sport in Toledo, Spain